Ludlow is a name. People and fictional characters with the surname and given name include:

People with the surname
 Augustus Ludlow, officer in the United States Navy during the War of 1812
 Augustus Ludlow, 2nd Earl Ludlow (1755–1811), British peer (see Earl Ludlow)
 Baron Ludlow, extinct titles in the Peerage of Ireland and the Peerage of the United Kingdom
 Clara Southmayd Ludlow (1852–1924), American medical entomologist
 Conrad Ludlow, American dancer and professor of dance
 Daniel Ludlow Kuri (born 1961), Mexican politician
 Earl Ludlow, extinct title in the Peerage of Ireland
 Edgar Ludlow-Hewitt (1886–1973), Royal Air Force commander in World War I
 Edmund Ludlow (c. 1617–1692), English parliamentarian, exiled in Switzerland
 Fitz Hugh Ludlow, American author, journalist, and explorer
 Frank Ludlow (1885–1972), English botanist, ornithologist, and World War I officer
 Frederick Ludlow (1796–?), early colonial settler in Western Australia
 George Ludlow, 3rd Earl Ludlow (1758–1842), British soldier
 George C. Ludlow (1830–1900), Governor of the American state of New Jersey
 Henry G. Ludlow (1797–1867), American minister and abolitionist, father of Fitzhugh
 Israel Ludlow (1765–1804), American pioneer surveyor of Northwest Territory
 Jayne Ludlow (born 1979), Welsh football player
 John de Ludlow, English medieval university chancellor
 John Malcolm Forbes Ludlow (1821–1911), British lawyer, public official and Christian socialist
 Louis Ludlow (1873–1950), American congressman from Indiana
 Martin Ludlow (born 1964), American politician from Los Angeles, California
 Morwenna Ludlow, British historian and theologian
 Peter Ludlow, 1st Earl Ludlow (1730–1803), British politician
 Peter Ludlow, American linguist and philosopher
 Roger Ludlow (1590–1664), English lawyer, magistrate and military officer; one of the founders of the colony of Connecticut
 Samuel Ludlow (judge) (1792–1880), American jurist from the state of New York
 Travis Ludlow (born 2003), English aviator
 William H. Ludlow (1821–1890), American politician, speaker of the New York State Assembly, father of William
 William Ludlow (1843–1901), American soldier and explorer of Yellowstone, son of William H.
 Willis Ludlow (1854–1938), American politician

People with the given name
 Ludlow Griscom (1890–1959), American ornithologist
 Ludlow Moody (1892–1981), Jamaican medical doctor and political leader
 Ludlow Ogden Smith, Philadelphia socialite who married Katharine Hepburn

Fictional characters with the name
 Donna Ludlow, English soap opera character
 Kelly Ludlow, American television character
 Ludlow Porch, American radio personality played by Bobby Crawford Hanson
 Maeve Ludlow, British soap opera character
 Ludlow Lamonsoff, a major protagonist of the 2015 film Pixels

See also
Ludlow (disambiguation)
Ludlow, a town in England
Earl Ludlow and Baron Ludlow, titles of peerages in Ireland and the UK